Alonzo L. "Lon" Stiner (June 20, 1903 – March 8, 1985) was an American football player and coach.  He was the head coach at Oregon State College—now Oregon State University—from 1933 to 1948, compiling a record of 74–49–17. Stiner led the Oregon State Beavers to the Pacific Coast Conference in 1941 and the three bowl game victories.

Early life
Born at Hastings, Nebraska,  Stiner graduated from the University of Nebraska in Lincoln.  He was captain of the football team and gained All-America honors in 1926.  After graduation, he worked as a teacher at the University of Colorado for two years.

Stiner moved to Oregon State College in 1928, where he served as an instructor, track coach, and assistant football coach before assuming the job of head football coach in 1933.

Coaching career
During his tenure as head football coach of Oregon State, Stiner compiled a 74–49–17 record, setting school records for wins, and winning percentage (.589).  His best season came in 1939, when his team went 9–1–1 and won the Pineapple Bowl over Hawaii, 39–6.

"Iron Men" Game
Stiner coached in one of the greatest upset ties in NCAA history.  On October 21, 1933, eleven Beaver "Iron Men" fought USC to a scoreless tie in what many consider to be the greatest game in Oregon State football history.  The Trojans, defending two-time national champions, brought an eighty-man squad to Multnomah Stadium in Portland and saw a 25-game win streak splattered by the Beavers.  The Beavers did not make a substitution, playing only eleven men, each of whom played both ways for the entire sixty minutes.

1942 Rose Bowl
Stiner was also the head coach of another famous game in Beaver football history.  His 1941 team played in the Rose Bowl.  This game produced two important firsts. It was OSU's first-ever trip to the famous New Year's Day classic, and it remains the only Rose Bowl ever played outside of Pasadena, California.  The reason for the move out of Pasadena was due to the attack on Pearl Harbor in December 1941.  The game was played at Duke University's Wallace Wade Stadium in Durham, North Carolina, with the undefeated Blue Devils picked as 3–1 favorites.  Oregon State pulled off the upset and won, 20–16.  Stiner, at 38, was the youngest head coach in Rose Bowl history.

The Pyramid Play
Stiner also played a key role in another famous first in football history.  The pyramid play, used in blocking kicks, originated as a prank at practice.  Amazingly enough, the play was successful in blocking a kick.  Stiner, upon noticing the success of the play, decided to attempt it in a game.  The play consisted of hoisting the  center, Clyde Devine, onto the shoulders of  tackles Harry Fields and Ade Schwammel.  At this height in the air, Devine could reach out and knock down any ball headed for the goal posts.

The first official use of the play was successfully executed against the University of Oregon in Multnomah Stadium in Portland.  The Pyramid was banned by the NCAA rules committee within a year.

Despite going 5–4–3 and taking his team to the 1949 Pineapple Bowl after the 1948 season, Stiner resigned in March, and was succeeded by Kip Taylor in 1949.  Stiner was 3–0 in bowl appearances.

After football
Stiner then worked as a labor relations representative for Edward Hines Lumber Company at Westfir, Oregon. When he retired in 1968, he and his wife Caroline moved to Woodburn; Caroline died in 1972.

Stiner moved to a life care center in Richland, Washington, around 1976, where he spent the last eight years of his life, to be near his daughter, Betty Ingram.  Stiner suffered ill health for the last year of his life.  Stiner is also survived by a son, Alonzo P. "Lon" Stiner, an attorney in Portland, and six grandchildren.  Memorial services were held at Riverview Abbey Chapel in Portland.

Stiner is an inductee of the Oregon Sports Hall of Fame.

Head coaching record

References

External links
 

1903 births
1985 deaths
American football tackles
Nebraska Cornhuskers football players
Oregon State Beavers football coaches
Oregon State Beavers track and field coaches
University of Colorado people
People from Hastings, Nebraska
Players of American football from Nebraska